Lady Lake is a lake in Todd County, in the U.S. state of Minnesota.

Lady Lake was named for state flower of Minnesota, the lady's slipper (Cypripedium reginae).

See also
List of lakes in Minnesota

References

Lakes of Minnesota
Lakes of Todd County, Minnesota